What's in Our Heart is an album by American country music artists George Jones and Melba Montgomery released in 1963 on United Artists Records.

Recording
On May 4, 1963, the Jones/Montgomery duet "We Must Have Been Out Of Our Minds" was released and rose to number three, charting for twenty-eight weeks.  The singers would chart seven more songs in the next four years.  The bluegrass-tinged What's In Our Heart, their first duet album, would eventually reach number 3 on the country album charts.

In his autobiography I Lived To Tell It All, Jones remained quite proud of the work he did with Montgomery:  "I had giant records years later with Tammy Wynette, and there were many other successful duet partners, such as Porter Wagoner and Dolly Parton and Conway Twitty and Loretta Lynn.  I'm not saying Melba and I were the first to sing male-female duets in country music because we weren't.  And I'm not saying we were the best.  But Melba said recently that she thinks we popularized the male-female format, and I agree."  In the book George Jones: The Life and Times of a Honky Tonk Legend, Bob Allen quotes Montgomery: "I was nervous as a cat!  Not only was it my first major session, but it was with George Jones!  George had been out roarin' the night before, and nobody even knew where he was until an hour before the session.  When he finally showed up, he was in a really good mood, and the whole thing came off really well."

Reception
AllMusic's Stephen Thomas Erlewine writes, "Many (including the man himself) rank these as Jones' best duets ever, putting them above his work with Tammy Wynette collaborations, when in truth they're kind of hard to compare - not only are they different from the lush, dramatic work with Tammy, they're quite a bit different than any other country he ever did, occasionally veering into the pile-driving intensity of bluegrass."

Track listing 
 "Let's Invite Them Over" (Onie Wheeler)
 "We Must Have Been Out of Our Minds" (Melba Montgomery)
 "Suppose Tonight Would Be Our Last" (George Jones, Montgomery)
 "I Let You Go" (Montgomery)
 "Multiply the Heartaches" (Fred Rose)
 "She's My Mother" (Charlie Louvin, Ira Louvin)
 "What's in Our Heart" (Jones, Johnny "Country" Mathis)
 "Until Then" (Montgomery, Carl Montgomery)
 "Don't Go" (Onie Wheeler)
 "Now Tell Me" (Pete Hunter)
 "There's a Friend in the Way" (Onie Wheeler)
 "Flame in My Heart" (Jones, Bernard Spurlock)

References

External links
 George Jones' Official Website
 Record Label

1963 albums
George Jones albums
Melba Montgomery albums
Albums produced by Pappy Daily
United Artists Records albums
Vocal duet albums